"Call Me" is a song by Greek-Cypriot singer Anna Vissi, originally released in 2003 in Greek as "Ise" (You Are). Written by Nikos Karvelas, "Call Me" was released in October 2004 as a promo track for radio stations in the U.S. and DJs by Nicky Kalliongis on his record label Moda Records. It was later released in April 2005 during its Billboard success as a digital download. After its Billboard success, it was released in Greece and Cyprus as a CD single.

Background
"Call Me" was originally released in Greek as "Ise" (You Are) on Vissi's 2003 album Paraksenes Eikones. After Anna Vissi flew to NYC to play a few songs for Nicky Kalliongis, he suggested that they release Ise in the US with English lyrics. In late 2004, Vissi signed with Nicky Kalliongis and his record label Moda Records in New York City for the release of "Call Me". Under the guidance of Nicky Kalliongis and with him overseeing the production and remixes it reached the #1 position on the Billboard Hot Club Play Chart and #2 on the Billboard Hot Dance Airplay Chart. It was also added to popular American retailer Abercrombie & Fitch's store playlist nationwide. In February 2005, Moda Records released "Call Me" as a digital download, including the original mix and many DJ mixes. Some of the remixes available with the downloaded included remixes by DJs Valentine, Chris Cox, Friscia & Lamboy, Georgia, Lee Cabrera, Mike Cruz, Riddler, and more.  Around the same time, the song also peaked at number 1 on the Billboard Dance Charts. To further promote the track, Vissi went on a mini club tour around United States and Canada.

After the success on the Billboard charts, Sony BMG Greece released it as a CD single in Greece and Cyprus in June 2005. The CD single also included a new English song called "Lie". The single peaked at number 1 on the Greek singles chart, and was certified Gold status in Greece.

Music video
The music video was directed by Manolis Tzirakis. Among the young men that act in the video is Kostas Martakis, who would go on to participate in Dream Show the following year and become a singer.

Track listing
"Call Me" (Original Version)
"Lie" (Radio Mix)
"Call Me" (Chris Cox Mix)
"Call Me" (Lee Cabrera Mix)

“Call Me” Remixes
Below all the Official remixes of "Call Me".

Chris Cox Club Anthem
Chris Cox Radio
Massive Cox Dub
Lee Cabrera
Lee Cabrera Dub (included on 12''inch only)
Mike Cruz Tribal
Mike Cruz Mixshow
Valentin Mixshow
Valentin Radio
Friscia & Lamboy Extended
Friscia & Lamboy Radio
Friscia & Lamboy Mixshow
Riddler Radio
Riddler Mixshow
Georgie Filtered Anthem

Release history

Chart performance

References

2005 singles
Anna Vissi songs
Songs written by Nikos Karvelas
Number-one singles in Greece
English-language Greek songs
2004 songs